Rebekah Kochan is an American actress. She is best known for her role as Tiffani von der Sloot in the Eating Out franchise.

Biography

Kochan has been acting since she was nine years old.  Her first role was in a Las Vegas production of Annie, where she played the lead.

Filmography

References

External links

Living people
American film actresses
Actresses from Las Vegas
American women comedians
21st-century American actresses
21st-century American comedians
Year of birth missing (living people)